Helen Gilby (born 18 June 1974) is a British sprint canoer and marathon canoeist who competed in the mid-1990s. At the 1996 Summer Olympics in Atlanta, she was eliminated in the semifinals of the K-2 500 m event.

References

1974 births
Canoeists at the 1996 Summer Olympics
Living people
Olympic canoeists of Great Britain
British female canoeists